Bindon Hill is an extensive Iron Age earthwork enclosing a coastal hill area on the Jurassic Coast near Lulworth Cove in Dorset, England, about  west of Swanage, about  south west of Wareham, and about  south east of Dorchester. It is within an Area of Outstanding Natural Beauty.

Hill fort 

The main rampart and external ditch (univallate) run for over 2 km along an east-west ridge parallel to the coast, which lies about 750 m to the south. The ridge rises to 168 m and the cliffs are 30–120 m high. At the western end, an incomplete series of ramparts curve back to the cliffs of Lulworth Cove. At the eastern end, the main rampart reaches the cliffs on the north side of Mupe Bay. The total enclosed area is about 110 ha.

The enormous enclosed area, lack of evidence of settlement in the interior, and the impossibility of effectively defending such a large perimeter, all suggest it was primarily an enclosed pasture for domesticated animals, not a strategic tribal hill fort.

Accessibility
The Eastern half of Bindon Hill is only accessible when the Lulworth Ranges are open to the public. It can be reached by a short walk from West Lulworth, or alternatively via the South West Coast Path from Lulworth Cove. The ranges are owned by the Ministry of Defence (MoD) and is part of the Armoured Fighting Vehicles (AFV) Gunnery School. The ranges are more than ,. Visitors are advised to keep to official footpaths and abide to local site notices, because tanks and Armoured vehicles are used in this area. Safety warnings about explosives and unexploded shells are posted nearby by the MoD and there is a flashing warning lamp situated on the hill, which is illuminated when the ranges are in use.

References

Bibliography

External links

Hills of Dorset
History of Dorset
Tourist attractions in Dorset
Jurassic Coast
Hill forts in Dorset
Archaeological sites in Dorset
Iron Age sites in England